Cirrhocephalina flaviceps is a moth in the family Crambidae. It was described by George Hampson in 1918. It is found in Peru.

References

Moths described in 1918
Spilomelinae